Bamla is a village in the Bhiwani district of the Indian state of Haryana. , the village had 2,143 households with a population of 10,859 of which 5,943 were male and 4,916 female.

References

Villages in Bhiwani district